Bottomless Pit is the fifth studio album by experimental hip hop group Death Grips, released on May 6, 2016, through Third Worlds and Harvest Records.

Background
On October 21, 2015, the group uploaded a video to their YouTube page titled Bottomless Pit. It features footage from 2013 of the late American actress Karen Black reciting lines from a film script that Death Grips drummer Zach Hill wrote months before her death. They also posted on their website and Facebook page that this would be the title for their upcoming fifth official studio album. Later, on December 16, the group posted a tweet containing the phrase "it won't lit", eventually revealed to be a lyric from the Bottomless Pit track "BB Poison".

On February 6, 2016, Death Grips released the song "Hot Head" from their upcoming album onto their SoundCloud and YouTube accounts. The cover art and tracklisting were then revealed on March 18, followed on April 19 by the announcement of a May 6 release date and a download link for a document containing lyrics for each track on the album.

On April 29, 2016, the album was leaked in its entirety from the band's SoundCloud page.

Critical reception

Bottomless Pit received generally positive reviews from critics. At Metacritic, which assigns a normalized rating out of 100 to reviews from mainstream publications, the album received an average score of 80 based on 11 reviews, indicating "generally favorable reviews".

Pitchfork wrote, "On their new album 'Bottomless Pit', they stitch together one of their most cohesive grotesques ever, renewing their focus on songcraft, rather than chicanery." Pretty Much Amazing described the album as "the best release from one of the most exciting artists of the 2010s", while PopMatters stated, "Bottomless Pit will clearly not be for all hip-hop or punk fans, but it is impossible to deny that this album, just like the rest of the trio's catalog, is doing a much-needed service to both genres by experimenting with them in unimaginable ways."

Rolling Stone ranked Bottomless Pit as the 50th best album of 2016.

In media
"Hot Head" was first used in a second season teaser for Animals, and was used again in "Alligator Man", the first episode of the second season of Atlanta. "Bubbles Buried in This Jungle" was used in "Parce Domine", the first episode and "Genre", the fifth episode of the third season of the television series Westworld.

Track listing

Notes

 "Giving Bad People Good Ideas" contains vocals from Clementine Creevy, which marked the first time another vocalist appeared on a Death Grips project since Mexican Girl on 2011's Exmilitary.
 "Hot Head" on the album has very slight changes to the instrumental compared to the original single release; it contains a different intro, the addition of a bass guitar, and is mixed lower than the original.
 The music video for "Eh" was removed from YouTube but was later readded.

Personnel
Credits adapted from the liner notes of Bottomless Pit.

Death Grips
 MC Ride – vocals
 Zach Hill – drums, production
 Andy Morin – keyboards, production

Additional personnel
 Clementine Creevy – vocals 
 Nick Reinhart – guitar , bass guitar 
 Geoff Neal – engineering
 Morgan Stratton – engineering

Charts

References

Death Grips albums
Harvest Records albums
2016 albums